Zorochros dermestoides is a species of beetle belonging to the family Elateridae.

It is native to Europe.

Synonyms:
 Zorochros minimus (Lacordaire, 1835)

References

Elateridae